Cuizhu station, is a station on Line 3 of the Shenzhen Metro. It opened on 28 June 2011. It is located at Cuizhu Road, Cuizhu Subdistrict, Luohu District, Shenzhen, China.

Station layout

Exits

References

External links
 Shenzhen Metro Cuizhu Station (Chinese)
 Shenzhen Metro Cuizhu Station (English)

Shenzhen Metro stations
Railway stations in Guangdong
Longgang District, Shenzhen
Railway stations in China opened in 2011